The Mick is an American television sitcom broadcast on Fox. Created by Dave Chernin and John Chernin, the series stars Kaitlin Olson, who is also an executive producer. The series premiered on January 1, 2017, and resumed in its regular Tuesday night slot on January 3, 2017. On January 11, 2017, Fox picked up the series for a full season of 17 episodes.

On February 21, 2017, Fox renewed the series for a 13-episode second season, which premiered on September 26, 2017, preceded by reruns of the first season on sister network FXX. On November 7, 2017, Fox ordered seven additional episodes, bringing the second season total to 20. On May 10, 2018, Fox cancelled the series after two seasons.

Plot
Mackenzie "Mickey" Molng (née Murphy), a tough, foul-mouthed woman, finds herself living in affluent Greenwich, Conn., to raise the pampered, and very sheltered children of her wealthy older sister, who has fled the country to avoid a federal indictment.

Cast and characters

Main
 Kaitlin Olson as Mackenzie "Mickey" Murphy
 Sofia Black-D'Elia as Sabrina Pemberton
 Thomas Barbusca as Chip Pemberton
 Jack Stanton as Ben "Benito" Pemberton
 Carla Jimenez as Alba Maldonado 
 Scott MacArthur as James "Jimmy" Shepherd

Recurring
 Tricia O'Kelley as Pamela "Poodle" Pemberton (née Murphy)
 Laird Macintosh as Christopher Pemberton
 E. J. Callahan as Colonel Pemberton
 Wayne Wilderson as Principal Gibbons
 Arnell Powell as Fred the Fed (season 1)

Guest

 Asif Ali as Security Guard
 Dave Annable as Teddy
 Bert Belasco as Dante
 Paul Ben-Victor as Jerry Berlin
 Cayden Boyd as Matty Pruitt
 Brianna Brown as Aimee
 Christopher Darga as Pit Boss
 Julie Ann Emery as Karen
 John Ennis as Sully
 Jada Facer as Olivia
 Andy Favreau as Kai
 Kirk Fox as Loan Shark
 Mo Gaffney as Principal Rita
 Jennie Garth as herself
 Matthew Glave as Howard Buckley
 Griffin Gluck as Dylan
 Rodney J. Hobbs as Lt. Shields
 Jason Kravits as Barry
 Izabella Miko as Yulia
 Jay Mohr as Bert
 Sam Pancake as Oliver Fishburn
 Susan Park as Liz
 Jeris Poindexter as Elderly Black Man
 Judith Roberts as Great-Grandma Rita Pemberton
 David Rees Snell as Don
 Lester Speight as Dominic
 Concetta Tomei as Grandma Tippy Pemberton
 Suzanne Whang as Dr. Frenkel
 Kevin Will as Omicron
 Michaela Watkins as Trish
 Rachel York as Dr. Goodby
 Sophia Ali as Alexis

Episodes

Production

Development
The pilot was written by Dave Chernin and John Chernin with Randall Einhorn directing. The series is filmed as a single-camera setup. The Chernins, Olson, and Einhorn serve as executive producers. The show is filmed entirely in California. An actual Los Angeles mansion is used in the series as the Pemberton estate.

Casting
On February 29, 2016, it was announced that Sofia Black-D'Elia had been cast as Sabrina. It was announced that Kaitlin Olson was cast as Mackenzie on March 2, 2016. Thomas Barbusca, Jack Stanton, and Carla Jimenez were cast as Chip Pemberton, Ben Pemberton, and Alba respectively on March 18, 2016. Susan Park was cast as Liz though she was dropped as a series regular early in the first season and instead appears as a recurring character. The role of Jimmy Shepherd was played by Nat Faxon in the pilot for The Mick, with the knowledge that Faxon's other commitments would prohibit him from continuing in the role if the pilot got picked up to series. Scott MacArthur, who had already been hired as a writer for the series, was later offered the Jimmy role and Fox re-shot the pilot prior to the series debut. On October 10, 2016, Dave Annable was cast as Teddy Grant in a recurring role.

On September 2, 2017, it was announced that Michaela Watkins joins season 2 in a guest role as Trish. On December 5, 2017, it was announced that Jennie Garth has been cast in a guest starring role. The next day, the show's creators revealed that Scott MacArthur had departed as a cast member but will remain as a writer for the show. In January 2018, however, MacArthur, along with showrunners Dave and John Chernin revealed to Den of Geek that MacArthur would in fact not be departing the show as a cast member and that their prior announcement was an effort to stimulate a reaction out the show’s fanbase: "Truth be told, there were people in season one who didn't like Jimmy and we thought that we hadn't given him a fair shake yet. So heading into season two we really wanted to do this character justice and show what was possible with him. It felt really good to see how upset people got when they thought that they were losing him. We think that he's such an integral part of the show and yeah, I don't think the show works as well without him." (His character missed just two episodes after MacArthur's "exit" in "The Divorce" [Season 2, Episode 9], reappearing in "The City" [Season 2, Episode 12].)

Reception
On Rotten Tomatoes, the first season has an approval rating of 58% based on 26 reviews, with an average rating of 6.07/10. The website's critics consensus reads, "Kaitlin Olson's considerable charm isn't enough to keep the intermittently funny The Mick from falling prey to conventional storylines and hard-to-root-for characters." On Metacritic, the season has a weighted average score of 50 out of 100, based on 27 critics, indicating "mixed or average reviews".

Ratings

References

External links
 
 

2010s American LGBT-related comedy television series
2010s American single-camera sitcoms
2017 American television series debuts
2018 American television series endings
English-language television shows
Fox Broadcasting Company original programming
Nudity in television
Obscenity controversies in television
Television controversies in the United States
Television series about dysfunctional families
Television series by 20th Century Fox Television
Television series by 3 Arts Entertainment
Television shows set in Connecticut